Mózgprocesor is a Polish video game created in 1989, and published in 1990 by Computer Adventure Studio for ZX Spectrum and the Atari 8-bit family (1991). It was Computer Adventure Studio's first and last game. It was created by ex-Atari alumni Piotr Kucharski, Krzysztof Piwowarski and Wiesław Florek. The team had previously created Smok Wawelski in 1987. The script was created within an hour and the whole game was ready after six weeks, without professional graphic programs or documentation. Reviews of the title were featured in  Bajtek 10/1998 and Top Secret 1/1990, Top Secret 2/1990 also included an interview with the developers, which at the time was unprecedented for a Polish game.

Despite the title's massive popularity in Poland, the game was readily pirated which significantly eroded the profits of the young development company and prevented it from releasing a second title. According to Techsty, it is the most discussed and most developed of all the Polish text-based adventure games. Gadzetomania thought the title was probably the first, Polish game published in a professional way. Logo24 deemed it the first Polish game that did not differ significantly from global standards.

References

External links

1990 video games
1990s interactive fiction
Video games set in 2016
Science fiction video games
Adventure games
Europe-exclusive video games
Atari 8-bit family games
Video games developed in Poland
ZX Spectrum games
Single-player video games